"Wild Life" is a single by Jack & Jack, released on 2 August 2014. The official music video produced by theAudience and directed by Niklaus Lange was premiered 31 October 2014. The song managed to peak at number 87 on the Billboard Hot 100.

Charts

References

2014 songs